Piz Alv (Romansh: "white peak") is the name of several mountains in Switzerland:

Piz Bianco, a prominence north of Piz Bernina
Piz Alv (Lepontine Alps), the tripoint between the cantons of Uri, Graubünden and Ticino
Piz Alv (Oberhalbstein Alps), near Innerferrera in Graubünden
Piz Alv (Livigno Alps), near Pontresina in Graubünden